Ellen Vesta Hamlin ( Emery; September 14, 1835 – February 1, 1925) was the second wife of Vice President Hannibal Hamlin, and thus second lady of the United States from 1861 to 1865. They were married a year after the death of his first wife Sarah Jane Emery in 1855 who was also her half-sister. She had two children with Hannibal Hamlin: Hannibal Emery, who later became the attorney general of Maine, and Frank. Hamlin also had four children from his first marriage: George Hamlin, Charles Hamlin, Cyrus Hamlin, and Sarah Hamlin Batchelder. She died in 1925 as one of the longest-living second ladies in history.

References

1835 births
1925 deaths
People from Minot, Maine
People from Bangor, Maine
Second ladies of the United States
Spouses of Maine politicians